András Gosztonyi (born 7 November 1990) is a Hungarian football player who plays for Móri SE in the Nemzeti Bajnokság III.

Career
He spent a week at Newcastle United on trial. Joe Kinnear claimed he would have a massive future at Newcastle should his trial work out. The trial never worked out and Gosztonyi returned to his club.

On 1 February 2010, the midfielder has been signed by Italian club Bari until the conclusion of the 2009–10 campaign. He transferred to the Italian club from MTK. In the spring season Gosztonyi made two substitute appearances for Bari (against Siena and Juventus).

International career
His original position is striker, but he played midfielder at the U-19 National team of Hungary.

Club statistics

Updated to games played as of 10 June 2020.

Honours

National team 
 FIFA U-20 World Cup:
Third place: 2009

Clubs 
Diósgyőr
Hungarian League Cup: 2013–14

References

External links
Profile at HLSZ.hu

1990 births
People from Kaposvár
Sportspeople from Somogy County
Living people
Hungarian footballers
Hungary youth international footballers
Hungary under-21 international footballers
Association football midfielders
MTK Budapest FC players
S.S.C. Bari players
Fehérvár FC players
Diósgyőri VTK players
Szombathelyi Haladás footballers
Śląsk Wrocław players
Kisvárda FC players
Dunaújváros PASE players
Nemzeti Bajnokság I players
Serie A players
Ekstraklasa players
Nemzeti Bajnokság II players
Hungarian expatriate footballers
Expatriate footballers in Italy
Hungarian expatriate sportspeople in Italy
Expatriate footballers in Poland
Hungarian expatriate sportspeople in Poland